The 2010 Peak Antifreeze & Motor Oil Indy 300 was the fourteenth round of the 2010 IndyCar Series season. It took place on Saturday, August 28, 2010. The race contested over 200 laps at the  Chicagoland Speedway in Joliet, Illinois.

Classification

Qualifying

Race

References

Peak Antifreeze and Motor Oil Indy 300
Peak Antifreeze and Motor Oil Indy 300
Peak Antifreeze and Motor Oil Indy 300
Chicagoland Indy 300